The 2007 Slovak Cup Final was the final match of the 2006–07 Slovak Cup, the 38th season of the top cup competition in Slovak football. The match was played at the Pasienky in Bratislava on 8 May 2007 between FC Senec and FC ViOn Zlaté Moravce. FC ViOn defeated Senec 4-0.

Route to the final

Match

Details

References

Slovak Cup Finals
Cup Final